Thomas Magladery (December 14, 1875 – October 29, 1954) was a merchant and political figure in Ontario. He represented Timiskaming in the Legislative Assembly of Ontario from 1914 to 1923 as a Conservative member.

The son of Thomas Magladery and Jessie Rennie, he was born in Parkhill, Middlesex County. Magladery served in the Canadian infantry during World War I, reaching the rank of captain. In 1910, he married Lillian Howson. Magladery was named Deputy Minister of Immigration in 1934. He died in New Liskeard, October 29, 1954, and was buried at the Pioneer Cemetery at that same city.

References 

1870s births
1954 deaths
Progressive Conservative Party of Ontario MPPs